= 2003 Afro-Asian Games medal table =

The official medal tally of the first Afro-Asian Games held at Hyderabad, India. China bagged the largest number of gold medals, followed by the host India in second place.

* Host nation (India)

Rank	Nation	Gold	Silver	Bronze	Total
1	China	25	11	5	41
2	India*	19	32	29	80
3	Japan	15	6	2	23
4	Nigeria	10	12	13	35
5	South Africa	10	11	15	36
6	South Korea	7	6	11	24
7	Algeria	7	6	9	22
8	Combined Africa	7	5	0	12
9	Uzbekistan	7	2	3	12
10	Kazakhstan	5	8	6	19
11	Ethiopia	5	5	3	13
12	Sudan	3	3	0	6
13	Iran	2	3	1	6
14	Kenya	2	0	3	5
15	Philippines	1	4	10	15
16	Egypt	1	1	4	6
17	Seychelles	1	1	2	4
18	Namibia	1	0	2	3
19	Cameroon	1	0	1	2
19	Tanzania	1	0	1	2
21	Vietnam	1	0	0	1
22	Senegal	0	6	3	9
23	Thailand	0	2	6	8
24	Indonesia	0	2	1	3
24	Pakistan	0	2	1	3
26	Burkina Faso	0	1	0	1
26	Qatar	0	1	0	1
26	Tajikistan	0	1	0	1
29	Zimbabwe	0	0	5	5
30	Sri Lanka	0	0	3	3
30	Uganda	0	0	3	3
32	Chinese Taipei	0	0	2	2
32	Malaysia	0	0	2	2
34	Congo	0	0	1	1
34	Libya	0	0	1	1
34	Mongolia	0	0	1	1
Totals (36 entries)		131	131	149	411
